Abid may refer to:
 Abid, Dezful, Khuzestan Province (ابيد - Abīd)
 Abid, Shush, Khuzestan Province (عبيد - ‘Abīd)

See also
 Ab Bid (disambiguation)